Cormorant fishing is a traditional fishing technique in which fishermen use trained cormorants to catch fish in rivers. Historically, cormorant fishing has taken place in China and Japan, as well as Greece, North Macedonia, and briefly, England and France. It was attested as a method used by the ancient Japanese in the Book of Sui, the official history of the Sui Dynasty of China, completed in 636 CE. Though cormorant fishing once was a successful enterprise, its primary use today is to serve the tourism industry. This artisan fishing method is no longer used anywhere except southwestern China, where it is also under threat from competition from more modern methods.

To control the birds, the fishermen tie a loose snare near the base of the bird's throat. The snare does not stop the bird from swallowing small fish, but prevents the bird from swallowing larger fish, which are held temporarily in their gullet. When a cormorant has caught a fish in its throat, the fisherman brings the bird back to the boat and has it regurgitate the fish.

The types of cormorants used differ based on the location. Chinese fishermen typically employ the great cormorant (Phalacrocorax carbo), while the Japanese cormorant (Phalacrocorax capillatus) is used in Japan and the neotropic cormorant (Nannopterum brasilianum) in Peru. Darters (birds in the genus Anhinga), which are close relatives of cormorants, are also used for this fishing technique on occasion.

China

In Guilin, Guangxi, cormorant birds are famous for fishing on the shallow Lijiang River. Elsewhere in southern China, the Bai people have utilized cormorant fishing since the 9th century on the banks of Erhai Lake. Traditionally practised for sustenance, cormorant fishing is now primarily performed for tourists.

Japan
Cormorant fishing in Japan is called  (鵜飼) in Japanese. Originally, it was done as one of the main fishing methods for ayu(sweetfish) fishing. However, since it is "unique" (as it uses birds and skillful techniques), viewing cormorant fishing, since the Heian period, has been one of amusements for aristocratic classes and warlords in Japan.

Oda Nobunaga started showing cormorant fishing for hospitality in Japan. In 1568, Oda Nobunaga, welcoming a messenger from Takeda Shingen, made a new boat and invited the messenger as a guest to show cormorant fishing. In addition, he chose ayu (sweetfish) with his own eyes and sent it to the guest as a gift at a later date.
Tokugawa Ieyasu, after the Summer Campaign (1615) of Siege of Osaka, visited Gifu, enjoyed seeing cormorant fishing and eating ayu. Thus began to offer ayu sushi to the Shogun, and masters of cormorant fishing were allowed to move freely over the river.

Cormorant fishing currently takes place in 13 cities in Japan. The most famous location is Gifu, Gifu Prefecture, home to cormorant fishing on the Nagara River, which has continued uninterrupted for the past 1,300 years. Cormorant fishing in Seki also takes place on the Nagara River, but it is called 'Oze cormorant fishing'. Only the cormorant fishing masters in Gifu and Seki are employed by the emperor and called Imperial Fishermen of the Imperial Household Agency.

Fuefuki, Yamanashi Prefecture (Fuefuki River)
Gifu, Gifu Prefecture (Nagara River)
Seki, Gifu Prefecture (Nagara River)
Inuyama, Aichi Prefecture (Kiso River)
Uji, Kyoto Prefecture (Uji River)
Kyoto, Kyoto Prefecture (Ōi River)
Arida, Wakayama Prefecture (Arida River)
Miyoshi, Hiroshima Prefecture (Basen River)
Masuda, Shimane Prefecture (Takatsu River)
Iwakuni, Yamaguchi Prefecture (Nishiki River)
Ōzu, Ehime Prefecture (Hiji River)
Hita, Ōita Prefecture (Mikuma River)
Asakura, Fukuoka Prefecture (Chikugo River)

Peru

Cormorants are used for fishing on Lake Titicaca by the Uru people in Peru. There are claims cormorant fishing occurred in Peru during the 5th century, 100 years earlier than Japan.

Europe
Cormorant fishing is an old tradition in Greece and North Macedonia, especially on Doiran Lake which lies in the border of the two countries, and it is still practiced today by some traditional fishermen. In Western Europe, cormorant fishing took place from the 16th to 17th centuries, primarily in England and France. In the 19th century, Francis Henry Salvin reintroduced the practice in England by putting on displays and bringing his birds to fisheries exhibitions. This "second phase" of English cormorant fishing lasted until about 1890.

See also
Otter fishing
Cormorant fishing on the Nagara River
Ukai (play)

References

Fishing techniques and methods
Cormorants
Working birds
Fishing in Asia